União Frederiquense de Futebol, commonly referred to as União Frederiquense, is a Brazilian football club based in Frederico Westphalen, Rio Grande do Sul. It currently plays in Campeonato Gaúcho Série A1, the top level of the Rio Grande do Sul state football league.

History
The club was founded on September 3, 2010. They competed for the first time in a professional competition in 2011, when they were eliminated in the Third Stage in the Campeonato Gaúcho Second Level. They won the 2021 Campeonato Gaúcho Série A2 and earned promotion to the top division.

Stadium
União Frederiquense de Futebol play their home games at Estádio João Pastre, commonly known as Estádio Vermelhão da Colina. The stadium has a maximum capacity of 4,000 people.

Honours

 Copa Serrana
 Winners (1): 2015

Campeonato Gaúcho Série A2
Winners (1): 2021

References

Association football clubs established in 2010
Football clubs in Rio Grande do Sul
2010 establishments in Brazil